Viki is a village in Saaremaa Parish, Saare County, on the western part of Saaremaa Island, Estonia.

Before the administrative reform in 2017, the village was in Kihelkonna Parish.

Composer and organist Peeter Süda (1883–1920) was born in Tammiku farmstead in Viki village.

References

External links
Mihkli Farm Museum in Viki village - Mihkli talumuuseum

Villages in Saare County